"Player's Prayer" is the third and final single Lloyd's second album Street Love. The track was produced and co-written by Jasper Cameron. Its release was confirmed by FMQB. The single was only released in the United States, where it only reached #74 on Billboard Hot R&B/Hip-Hop Songs chart. Although the song was a favorite among many, The single lacked promotion and didn't receive a music video.

Other information

The single was supposedly released on July 17, 2007, yet there is still no video for the single, and low promotion of it as of October 1, 2007.
J. Holiday has a song from his debut CD called, "Pimp in Me," and it has a very similar beat, with basically the same meaning as "Player's Prayer." This can be attributed to the fact that both songs were written and produced by Jasper Cameron.

Charts

2007 singles
Lloyd (singer) songs
Songs written by Jasper Cameron
2006 songs
Songs written by Lloyd (singer)
Universal Music Group singles